Airstrikes were conducted by the Israeli Air Force late at night on 20 November 2019.

The strikes took place in Damascus near an airport where Israel says they struck dozens of Iranian targets in response to rocket fire a day before in Golan Heights. While Syrian state media only claimed two civilians were killed, a British war group claims that over 23 (including 15 Iranians) were killed.

Aftermath
Israel was put on high alert expecting retribution for the strikes. Israel is concerned that Iran might strike in the upcoming days as revenge.

References

See also
 Casualty recording
 Syria missile strikes (September 2018)
 Syria missile strikes (August 2019)
 List of the Israel Defense Forces operations
 

2019 in the Syrian civil war
November 2019 events in Syria
2019 in Israel
21st-century aircraft shootdown incidents
21st century in Damascus
Aerial operations and battles involving Israel
Airstrikes during the Syrian civil war
Military operations of the Syrian civil war in 2019
Attacks on buildings and structures in Syria
Damascus in the Syrian civil war
Rif Dimashq Governorate in the Syrian civil war
Israel–Syria military relations
Iran–Israel conflict during the Syrian civil war
Israeli involvement in the Syrian civil war